The Battle of Am Zoer occurred on June 18, 2008 when the Chadian army caught up with a rebel column that had been advancing towards the capital, N'Djamena. Sudanese forces were reported to have attacked Chadian positions on the border in previous days and the rebels had been seen passing through several eastern villages.  The Chadian army engaged the rebels near the town of Am Zoer and routed them killing over 150 and capturing 20.  Dozens of military vehicles were also recovered and three government soldiers died.

Sources

https://web.archive.org/web/20110520141838/http://afp.google.com/article/ALeqM5hGXCr7VUY5_C4yMSEujqcTZw4lyg

2008 in Chad
Am Zoer
Am Zoer